"Rosso relativo" is a song written by Italian pop singer Tiziano Ferro. It was released as the fourth single from his first album Rosso Relativo (2002). Although the lyrics seem to talk about sex, Tiziano Ferro admits that the real theme of the song is the conflictual relationship that he has with food. It should be recalled that the singer before he became famous was obese. In the song is repeated several times the name "Paola". Paola is the name of Tiziano's cousin.

Formats and track listings
CDS - Rosso relativo (Italy)
 Rosso relativo
 Perdono (English version)
 Perdono (French version)
 Perdona (Spanish version)
 Rosso relativo (Videoclip)

CDS - Rojo relativo (Spain)
 Rojo relativo

CDS - Rosso relativo (Germany)
Rosso relativo (Italian album version)
Rosso relativo (Signatibet Remix)
Rosso relativo (Ghost production dance remix)

CDS - Rosso relativo (France)
Rosso relativo (Italian version)
Rosso relativo (French version)

CDS - Rosso relativo  (Mexico)
 Rojo Relativo
 Rojo Relativo (Remix 1)
 Rojo Relativo (Remix 2)
 Rojo Relativo (Remix 3)

CDS - Promo Mexico & Video (Mexico)
 Perdona
 Alucinado
 Rojo relativo
 Las cosas que no dices
 Perverso (Spanish version)
 Alucinado (Italian version)
 Perverso (Italian version)

Download digital
 Rosso relativo (Italian version)
 Rojo relativo (Spanish version)
 Romance relativo (Portuguese version)

Charts

Peak positions

References

External links
 TizianoFerro.com — official site

2002 singles
Tiziano Ferro songs
Songs written by Tiziano Ferro
Italian-language songs
Rhythm and blues songs
2002 songs
EMI Records singles
Song recordings produced by Michele Canova